Terence George Wire, known as Terry Wire, (2 Mar 1941 – 14 May 2014) was a local Labour politician in Northampton, England.

He was a member of the Labour party and was Mayor of Northampton for 2003–04. He served as a member of  the Northamptonshire County Council and was Labour chief whip on both authorities, chairman of the county council and vice-chair of Northants Police Authority and deputy lieutenant in 2010.

Before becoming a politician he was member of the fire service.

He died from cancer in Cynthia Spencer Hospice for whom he had been a strong fund raiser over the years and he established the April Fools Harley Run which still runs to this day.

References 

1941 births
2014 deaths
Mayors of places in Northamptonshire
Members of Northamptonshire County Council
Charity fundraisers (people)
Labour Party (UK) mayors
20th-century philanthropists